Rhagio lineola  is a species of 'snipe flies' belonging to the family Rhagionidae. It is a Palearctic species with a limited distribution in Europe.

Description
Rhagio lineola is a small species (6 mm.). The legs are mainly yellowish, with a broad brown band on the fore and hind femora (some Irish specimens have this pattern almost obscured by dark colour (var. monticola Verrall)). The body is covered with short, yellowish hairs. The scutellum is yellow, grey at the base.

Biology
Often found on leaves of undergrowth in woodland. The flight season is long, from May until October.

References

External links

 
 BioLib

Rhagionidae
Brachyceran flies of Europe
Insects described in 1794
Taxa named by Johan Christian Fabricius